Poland national youth football team can refer to the following age group teams:

 Poland national under-21 football team
 Poland national under-20 football team
 Poland national under-19 football team
 Poland national under-18 football team
 Poland national under-17 football team
 Poland national under-16 football team

Poland national football team
National youth association football teams
Youth association football in Poland